Al Midhatiya or Al-Hamza Gharbi is a city in Babil, Iraq.

Background
Al Midhatiya is named after Midhat Pasha who rebuilt the city, it is also known as "Al-Hamza Gharbi" which hosts the tomb of "Al-Hamza bin Al-Qasim", grandson of Abbas ibn Ali.

References

Populated places in Babil Governorate
Populated places on the Euphrates River
District capitals of Iraq